Konrad Eubel or Conradus Eubel (19 January 1842 – 5 February 1923) was a German Franciscan historian. He is known for his reference work, the Hierarchia Catholica Medii Aevi, on medieval popes, cardinals and bishops. It appeared in three volumes, beginning in 1898.  It covers the period 1198 to 1592, and is a more detailed version of the Series episcoporum Ecclesiae Catholicae by Pius Bonifacius Gams.

Under the title of the Hierarchia Catholica Medii et Recentioris Aevi the work has continued and now stands at nine volumes covering the period from 1198 to 1922.

Other works include a Franciscan bullarium.

References
 Bullarii Franciscani epitome : sive summa bullarum in eiusdem bullarii quattuor prioribus tomis relatarum addito supplemento in quo tum gravissima illorum quattuor voluminum diplomata verbotenus recepta tum nonnulla quae in eis desiderantur documenta sunt inserta / iussu atque auspiciis Dominici Reuter a Conrado Eubel eiusdem ordinis definitore generali redacta, Apud Claras Aquas: Typis Collegii S. Bonaventurae, 1908.
 Eubel, Konrad, Geschichte der oberdeutschen (Strassburger) Minoriten-Provinz / mit Unterstützung der Görresgesellschaft herausgegeben von P. Konrad Eubel. Würzburg : F.X. Bucher, 1886. 
 Eubel, Konrad, Hierarchia catholica medii aevi, sive Summorum pontificum, S. R. E. cardinalium, ecclesiarum antistitum series ab anno 1198 usque ad annum perducta e documentis tabularii praesertim Vaticani collecta, digesta, edita per Conradum Eubel, 6 vols., Monasterii, Sumptibus et Typis Librariae Regensbergianae, 1913–1967.
Meinrad Sehi (1923). Eubel Konrad, Franziskaner-Minorit, PDF

External links

K. Eubel, Hierarchia Catholica, vol. 1-4 
K. Eubel, Hierarchia Catholica, vol. 1,2,4-6 

1842 births
1923 deaths
German Franciscans
20th-century German historians
German male non-fiction writers
19th-century German historians